Manuel Peña Garcés (born January 2, 1983 in Castellón de la Plana) is a Spanish basketball coach currently Assistant Coach in Gran Canaria at Liga Endesa with Jaka Lakovic.  

2021–2022 as Sporting Technical Director at Stadium Casablanca after being 3 years at Basket Zaragoza as Assistant Coach in Liga Endesa. He was 5 seasons at Reading Rockets in English NBL1 where they got different achievements (1 Regular League, 1 National Cup and 1 Trophy) arriving to different finals and increasing the structure of the club meanwhile Manuel Pena was Head Coach and Technical Director. 

He was also the head coach of the U15 men's English National Team 2016–2017 and 2017–2018. 

He was teacher in the course for coaches level 3 CES for the Spanish Basketball Federation FEB from 2011 till 2018.

He is also cofounder of SportCoach, website for development, learning and teaching for coaches.

References

External Articles 
 Interview Manuel Peña Preseason 2017-2018 BBC
 Article in Hoopsfix about National Team Coaching Staff 2017
 Article about the visit of JMA Reading Rockets Academy to Spanish Federation Museum 2017

 Article in the Reading Chronicle about Coaching Clinic in preseason 2016-2017

 Article about a life in the day of Basketball Coach 2015

Basketball coaches